Herbert John Peer (November 12, 1910 – July 19, 1992) was a Canadian professional ice hockey right winger who played in one National Hockey League game for the Detroit Red Wings during the 1939–40 season, on March 15, 1940 against the Chicago Black Hawks. The rest of his career, which lasted from 1932 to 1948, was spent in various minor leagues, as well as two seasons in the English National League.

Career statistics

Regular season and playoffs

See also
 List of players who played only one game in the NHL

References
 

1910 births
1992 deaths
Canadian expatriate ice hockey players in the United States
Canadian ice hockey goaltenders
Detroit Red Wings players
Fort Worth Rangers players
Harringay Racers players
Ice hockey people from Ontario
Omaha Knights (AHA) players
Ontario Hockey Association Senior A League (1890–1979) players
Ottawa Senators (QSHL) players
Sportspeople from Mississauga
Tulsa Oilers (USHL) players
Valleyfield Braves players